Joulaki (also Romanized as Jūlakī and Jūlekī) is a village in Sar Joulaki Rural District, Joulaki District, Aghajari County, Khuzestan Province, Iran. At the 2011 census, its population was 1,459, in 385 families.

References 

Populated places in Aghajari County